Limaní is a rural barrio in the municipality of Adjuntas, Puerto Rico.

History
Puerto Rico was ceded by Spain in the aftermath of the Spanish–American War under the terms of the Treaty of Paris of 1898 and became an unincorporated territory of the United States. In 1899, the United States Department of War conducted a census of Puerto Rico finding that the population of Limaní barrio was 1,075.

Notable residents
 José Esteban Lopez Maldonado, "Agricultural Son of Puerto Rico" is Puerto Rico's youngest farmer and agricultural entrepreneur. He launched the Esteban Bianchi Maldonado Agricultural School in 2017 when he was 14 years old.

See also

 List of communities in Puerto Rico

References

External links

Barrios of Adjuntas, Puerto Rico